This is a list of colleges and universities with NCAA-sanctioned fencing teams. Fencing is a coed sport, with teams having men's and women's squads, although some schools field only a women's team. Schools of every division compete together regularly. Most major conferences do not sponsor fencing, with the notable exceptions of the Ivy League, the Atlantic Coast Conference, and the Mountain Pacific Sports Federation. The Atlantic Coast Conference reinstated the sport beginning in 2014–15 after having previously sponsored it from 1971 through 1980, while the Mountain Pacific Sports Federation added the sport beginning in the 2021-22 season. Most other schools compete as independents.

Division I schools

 Atlantic Coast Conference
 Boston College
 Duke University
 University of North Carolina at Chapel Hill
 University of Notre Dame
 Ivy League
 Brown University (women only)
 Columbia University (with Barnard College)
 Cornell University (women only)
 Harvard University
 University of Pennsylvania
 Princeton University
 Yale University
 Mountain Pacific Sports Federation
 United States Air Force Academy (Air Force)
 University of the Incarnate Word
 Stanford University
 University of California, San Diego
 Independents
 Cleveland State University
 University of Detroit Mercy
 Fairleigh Dickinson University (women only)
 Lafayette College
 Long Island University
 New Jersey Institute of Technology
 Northwestern University (women only)
 Ohio State University
 Pennsylvania State University
 Sacred Heart University
 St. John's University, New York
 Temple University (women only)
 Wagner College (women only, co-ed effective 2023-24)

Division II schools

 Wayne State University

Division III schools

 Brandeis University
 City College of New York (women only)
 Denison University (women only)
 Drew University
 Haverford College
 Hunter College
 Johns Hopkins University
 Lawrence University
 Massachusetts Institute of Technology
 New York University
 Stevens Institute of Technology
 Tufts University (women only)
 Vassar College
 Wellesley College (women only)
 Wheaton College (beginning 2024-25 season) 
 Yeshiva University

See also
 NCAA Fencing Championships
 Intercollegiate Fencing Association (IFA)
 National Intercollegiate Women's Fencing Association (NIWFA)
 United States Association of Collegiate Fencing Clubs (USACFC)
 United States Fencing Hall of Fame

References

External links
 NCAA Fencing

College fencing in the United States
Fen